Robert Alfred Rahilly (12 July 1887 – 9 December 1935) was an Australian rules football player. He was born in Ballarat, Victoria.

Playing career
Rahilly's senior career began in Ballarat for South Ballarat Football Club.

He played in Broken Hill; and, from there, represented New South Wales in the 1908 Melbourne Carnival.

In 1910 he moved to Fitzroy in the Victorian Football League where he played 33 matches before leaving in late 1912 to return to South Ballarat.

In a match for Fitzroy in 1911 against St Kilda Rahilly hit the goalposts four times in a match, which remains a record for VFL/AFL football (Alby Pannam equalled this feat in 1936).

Rahilly spent time at Sturt in South Australia during 1913 before moving to Broken Hill.

The 1914 season saw Rahilly return to the VFL, playing two matches for Essendon before moving again to Northcote.

Military service
Rahilly enlisted with the Australian Imperial Force in June 1915, leaving Melbourne in November 1915 on HMAT Ascanius. After serving in France and rising to the rank of Sergeant, Rahilly returned to Australia in March 1919.

References

External links

1887 births
1935 deaths
Fitzroy Football Club players
Essendon Football Club players
Sturt Football Club players
Northcote Football Club players
South Ballarat Football Club players
Australian military personnel of World War I
Australian rules footballers from Ballarat